Padma Shri Award, India's fourth highest civilian honours - Winners, 1954–1959:

Recipients

References

Explanatory notes

External links
 
 

Recipients of the Padma Shri
Lists of Indian award winners
1950s in India
1950s-related lists